Maxime Poisson (born 3 October 1973 in France) is a French retired footballer.

References

Association football defenders
Association football forwards
Association football midfielders
French footballers
Le Mans FC players
Nîmes Olympique players
1973 births
Living people